Swynnerton is a civil parish in the Borough of Stafford, Staffordshire, England. It contains 62 listed buildings that are recorded in the National Heritage List for England. Of these, two are listed at Grade I, the highest of the three grades, six are at Grade II*, the middle grade, and the others are at Grade II, the lowest grade.  The parish contains villages including Swynnerton, Tittensor, Yarnfield, and Hanchurch, and the surrounding area.  In the parish is the Trentham Estate, the area around the former Trentham Hall, most of which has been demolished.  The remains of the hall, associated structures, and buildings in the garden and surrounding park are listed.  Outside the estate, most of the listed buildings are houses and associated structures, cottages, farmhouses and farm buildings, the earlier of which are timber framed.  The other listed buildings include churches and a chapel, items in churchyards, a country house and associated structures, buildings associated with a pumping station, bridges, and war memorials.


Key

Buildings

Notes and References

Notes

Citations

Sources

Lists of listed buildings in Staffordshire